Route 246 is a collector road in the Canadian province of Nova Scotia.

It is located in the northern part of the province and connects Tatamagouche at Trunk 6 with Wentworth, Nova Scotia at Trunk 4.

Communities
Wentworth
West New Annan
Tatamagouche

Parks
Tatamagouche Provincial Park
Wentworth Provincial Park

See also
List of Nova Scotia provincial highways

References

Nova Scotia provincial highways
Roads in Colchester County
Roads in Cumberland County, Nova Scotia